The 2002 National Invitation Tournament was the 2002 edition of the annual NCAA college basketball competition.

Selected teams
Below is a list of the 40 teams selected for the tournament.

Georgetown declines invitation
Big East Conference member Georgetown originally was among the teams selected, but declined to take part. Hoyas head coach  Craig Esherick explained that Georgetown′s home court, the MCI Center in Washington, D.C., was booked to host the East Regional of the 2002 NCAA Division I men's basketball tournament, meaning that accepting the NIT invitation would have required the Hoyas to play on the road in the West for two weeks, forcing his players to miss many of their classes. After playing a similar schedule the previous season during the 2001 NCAA tournament, Esherick had concluded that missing so many classes to play in the NIT, a tournament which did not offer a chance for a national championship, was not in the best interest of Georgetowns players.

Esherick's controversial decision meant that Georgetown had no postseason play for the first time since the 1973–74 season. Georgetown became the first team to turn down an NIT bid since Louisville turned down a bid to the 1987 NIT.

Bracket
Below are the four first round brackets, along with the four-team championship bracket.

Semifinals & finals

See also
 2002 Women's National Invitation Tournament
 2002 NCAA Division I men's basketball tournament
 2002 NCAA Division II men's basketball tournament
 2002 NCAA Division III men's basketball tournament
 2002 NCAA Division I women's basketball tournament
 2002 NCAA Division II women's basketball tournament
 2002 NCAA Division III women's basketball tournament
 2002 NAIA Division I men's basketball tournament
 2002 NAIA Division II men's basketball tournament
 2002 NAIA Division I women's basketball tournament
 2002 NAIA Division II women's basketball tournament

References

National Invitation
National Invitation Tournament
2000s in Manhattan
Basketball competitions in New York City
College sports in New York City
Madison Square Garden
National Invitation Tournament
National Invitation Tournament
Sports in Manhattan